Greeves may refer to:

Greeves (motorcycles), British motorcycle manufacturer
Greeves (surname), includes a list of people with the name

See also

Greeve (Old French for Greave), a piece of armour that protects the leg
Greaves (disambiguation)
Greve (disambiguation)
Grieves (disambiguation)